The Huerva River is a river in Aragon, Spain. It is a tributary of the Ebro. Its mean annual discharge is only .

Course
Flowing northwestwards near Lagueruela and Villadoz, it increases its size near Villarreal de Huerva when it is joined by the Arroyo de Villalpando. Then it flows northeastwards past Mainar, Cerveruela, Vistabella de Huerva, Tosos (formerly Alcañiz de la Huerva), Villanueva de Huerva, Muel, Cuarte de Huerva, Cadrete and María de Huerva until its waters reach the Ebro at Zaragoza, where is called 'La Huerva'.

Ecology
The Huerva is relatively little polluted in its upper course, hence endangered species like the Austropotamobius pallipes crayfish and fishes like Barbus haasi, Rutilus arcasii and Chondrostoma toxostoma are to be found in its waters.

See also 
 List of rivers of Spain

References

External links 

 El río Huerva, un oasis entre el Sistema Ibérico y el Valle del Ebro (PDF).
 Río Huerva. Aguas arriba del embalse de las Torcas

Rivers of Spain
Ebro basin
Sistema Ibérico
Rivers of Aragon